Etobicoke Centre is a provincial electoral district in Toronto, Ontario, Canada. It elects one member to the Legislative Assembly of Ontario.

It was created in 1999 from parts of Etobicoke West and Etobicoke—Humber.

When the riding was created, it included all of Etobicoke south of a line following the 401 to Dixon Road to Royal York Road to La Rose Avenue and north of a line following Dundas Street to the 427 to Burnhamthorpe Road to Kipling Avenue to Mimico Creek to the Canadian Pacific Railway to Dundas Street.

In 2007, the northern border was altered to follow Dixon Road all the way to Humber River.

Members of Provincial Parliament

Election results

2007 electoral reform referendum

References

External links
Elections Ontario Past Election Results
Elections Ontario - Map of riding for 2018 election

Etobicoke
Provincial electoral districts of Toronto